William Wightman (by 1517 – 1580) was an English politician.

He was a Member (MP) of the Parliament of England for Midhurst in 1547, Wilton in March 1553, 1563 and 1571; Poole in April 1554, Carmarthen Boroughs in 1555, and Ludgershall in  1559.

References

1580 deaths
Members of the Parliament of England (pre-1707) for constituencies in Wales
Year of birth uncertain
English MPs 1547–1552
English MPs 1553 (Edward VI)
English MPs 1554
English MPs 1555
English MPs 1559
English MPs 1563–1567
English MPs 1571